Two ships of the Royal Navy have borne the name HMS Pantaloon:

 was a unique 10-gun brig built at Troon as the Duke of Portland's yacht in 1831, and purchased later that year, keeping her civilian name; following dhow chasing to suppress the East African slave trade, broken up in 1852.
 was an 11-gun  wooden screw sloop launched in 1860 at Devonport Dockyard and sold in 1867.

References

Royal Navy ship names